Troy Southgate (born 22 July 1965) is a British far-right political activist and a self-described national-anarchist. He has been affiliated with far-right and fascist groups, such as National Front and International Third Position. He co-created the think tank New Right alongside Jonathan Bowden and is the founder and editor-in-chief of Black Front Press. Southgate's movement has been described as working to "exploit a burgeoning counter culture of industrial heavy metal music, paganism, esotericism, occultism and Satanism that, it believes, holds the key to the spiritual reinvigoration of western society ready for an essentially Evolian revolt against the culturally and racially enervating forces of American global capitalism."

Far-right activism
Southgate joined the National Front in 1984 and began writing for publications such as National Front News and Nationalism Today. According to Searchlight magazine, in 1987 he joined the Society of St. Pius X (SSPX).

In 1998, he and other ENM members founded the National Revolutionary Faction. In 2001, Southgate and the NRF were the subject of a Sunday Telegraph article, in which the NRF was accused of being a neo-Nazi organisation infiltrating animal rights groups to spread fascism.

Southgate's national-anarchist ideology has been described as an opportunistic appropriation of aspects of leftist counter-culture in the service of a racist, far-right ideology.

Black Front Press
Black Front Press was established in 2010 by Southgate to print his biography of Otto Strasser, and has subsequently become a publisher of historical, political, philosophical and esoteric texts.

Views
Southgate, who graduated in history and theology from the University of Kent at Canterbury in 1997, comes from a non-religious background—although he converted to Catholicism in 1987 and was in that same year, according to Searchlight, associated with the Society of St. Pius X (SSPX). Southgate later joined the International Third Position (ITP), believing it to be ‘the legitimate heir to the National Revolutionary Movement in Britain’, though he eventually broke with it in 1992, accusing its membership of gross financial impropriety, hypocrisy, racial miscegenation and of practising a ‘bourgeois’ form of reactionary ultra-Catholic fascism incompatible with the ‘revolutionary’ nationalism that, he claimed, they had betrayed.

According to Searchlight, in 1998 Southgate was partly the subject of a smear piece by former colleagues in the ITP, in the booklet Satanism and its Allies – The Nationalist Movement Under Attack, published by Final Conflict, and linking him and others that left the ITP to Satanism, with which he has never been involved. Graham D. Macklin refers to this slander as an "attack" due to leaving the "staunchly Catholic ITP"  although he points out that it was only later, after the original publication of the booklet, that the ITP decided for some reason to produce an update that "singled out Southgate as a 'Satanist' and 'pro-faggot'".

Southgate, to further his ideology of "revolutionary nationalism", subsequently formed the English National movement, which denounced Hitler and Mussolini as "reactionary charlatans" whilst praising fascists he felt had represented the Third Position more sincerely, such as Otto Strasser, Corneliu Zelea Codreanu, and José Antonio Primo de Rivera. Around this time he began to justify British ethnic homogeneity, which he claimed was "not racist", by recourse to the European New Right concept of Ethnopluralism.

Southgate rejected Catholicism in 1997, and gravitated towards the extreme-right interpretation of traditionalism espoused by Julius Evola, particularly Evola's "spiritual racism", and synthesized this with Carl Jung's notion of the collective unconscious in order to push the idea of a "primeval Aryan psyche". The multiplicity of his influences led to his espousing an idiosyncratic form of palingenetic ultranationalism that divorced itself from the "artificial" concept of the nation-state.

Southgate subsequently incorporated green-anarchism into his perspective in order to counter the 'corrosive influence of urbanism and decay', and embraced neo-pagan and heathen groups. Along with like-minded musicians, he sought to diffuse the ideals of Mithraic paganism and Nordic folk myths into music-orientated youth cultures.

References

1965 births
Alt-right politicians in the United Kingdom
Alt-right writers
Living people
People from Crystal Palace, London
National Front (UK) politicians
English fascists
Alumni of the University of Kent
People associated with the University of Kent
English nationalists
English magazine editors
English autobiographers
Publishers (people) from London
English expatriates in Portugal
English modern pagans
Neo-fascists
Strasserism